Arizona Proposition 107 was a proposed same-sex marriage ban, put before voters by ballot initiative in the 2006 general election. If passed, it would have prohibited the state of Arizona from recognizing same-sex marriages or civil unions. The state already had a statute defining marriage as the union of a man and a woman and prohibiting the recognition of same-sex marriages performed elsewhere.

This proposed amendment to the Arizona Constitution failed, with 48.2% voting in favor and 51.8% opposed, making Arizona the first U.S. state to defeat a state constitutional amendment banning same-sex marriage. Several states approved similar measures between 1998 and 2006.

The proposition was backed by the Protect Marriage Arizona coalition, which included the Center for Arizona Policy and United Families Arizona. The proposition was primarily opposed by the Arizona Together coalition, which included the Arizona Human Rights Fund and the Human Rights Campaign.

Voters approved a more limited constitutional amendment which banned same-sex marriage but not state-recognized civil unions or domestic partnerships, 2008 Arizona Proposition 102, in 2008 with 56% of the vote.

Official title and text
An Initiative Measure

Proposing an amendment to the Constitution of Arizona; amending the Constitution of Arizona; by adding Article XXX; relating to the protection of marriage

To preserve and protect marriage in this state, only a union between one man and one woman shall be valid or recognized as a marriage by this state or its political subdivisions and no legal status for unmarried persons shall be created or recognized by this state or its political subdivisions that is similar to that of marriage.

Electoral results

Statewide

By county

See also 
 List of Arizona Ballot Propositions
 2008 Arizona Proposition 102
 LGBT rights in Arizona

References

External links 
 Proposition Text at AZ Secretary of State site (including arguments for and against the measure)
 Protect Marriage Arizona (Yes On Prop 107)
 Arizona Together (No On Prop 107)
 The Center for Arizona Policy
 The Human Rights Campaign
 The Money Behind the 2006 Marriage Amendments – National Institute on Money in State Politics

2006 Arizona elections
2006 ballot measures
Arizona ballot measures
2006 in LGBT history
LGBT in Arizona
Initiatives in the United States
Same-sex marriage ballot measures in the United States